Mohammadabad-e Rud Shur (also Romanized as Moḩammadābād-e Rūd Shūr and Moḩammadābād-e Rūdshūr) is a village in Rigan Rural District, in the Central District of Rigan County, Kerman Province, Iran. At the 2006 census, its population was 479, in 100 families.

References 

Populated places in Rigan County